Genii (a plural form of genie) are supernatural creatures in early pre-Islamic Arabian and later Islamic mythology and theology.

Genii may also refer to:

 Genii (magazine), or The Conjurors' Magazine
 Genii (Stargate), fictional characters in the TV series
 Genii Capital, a Luxembourg-based investment firm

See also

 Genie (disambiguation)
 Genius (disambiguation)
 Temple of the Five Genii (disambiguation)